As of September 2020, this is a list of supermarket chains, past and present, which operate or have branches in more than one country, whether under the parent corporation's name or another name.  For supermarkets that are only in one country, see the breakdown by continent at the bottom of this page. Numbers are provided as the largest reported, and are largely inaccurate.

Multinational

Africa

Asia

Europe

North America

Oceania

South America

References
 Parts of this article are adapted from CorpKnowPedia under the clauses of GFDL.

See also
 List of hypermarkets